Dacryoconarida is an extinct subclass of free living animals from the Tentaculita class, 
which were common in the Devonian oceans (Fisher, 1962). Dacryoconarids have a subspherical, 
drop- or tear-shaped embryonic chamber (Farsan 2005). The phylogenetic affinities of tentaculites are not fully resolved; they have often been placed among molluscs, but recent microstructural analyses place them among the Lophophorata. Their fossils are known from Devonian rocks of Australia, Asia, Europe, North Africa and North America.

References 

 Farsan, N.M. 2005. Description of the early ontogenetic part of the Tentaculitids, with implications for classification. Lethaia 38: 255-270.

External links 
 
 Dacryoconarida at fossilworks

Tentaculita
Devonian animals
Devonian first appearances
Devonian extinctions
Protostome subclasses
Prehistoric animal taxa
Fossil taxa described in 1962